Andrij Malysh (born July 6, 1983) is a former Ukrainian professional basketball player.

He played at the 2002 FIBA Europe Under-20 Championship with the Ukrainian national junior team.

External links
 FIBA Europe
 Andrij Malysh at basketball.eurobasket.com

References 

BC Budivelnyk players
Ukrainian men's basketball players
1983 births
Living people
BC Kyiv players
BC Sumyhimprom players
BC Cherkaski Mavpy players
BC Zaporizhya players
BC Dnipro players
BC Donetsk players
Power forwards (basketball)
Basketball players from Kyiv